Hasegawa Chikuyō, also known under the art name Suiken Chikuyō, was a Japanese ukiyo-e print designer.

Hasegawa's birth and death dates are unknown.  He was active during the early Meiji-period bunmei-kaika, when Japan was rapidly Westernizing and modernizing.  Many of Hasegawa's works, as with those of contemporaries such as Hiroshige III, Kiyochika, and Kuniteru, document this period of change.  Hasegawa's subjects include modern Western-influenced architecture and street scenes.

References

Works cited

 

19th-century Japanese artists
Ukiyo-e artists